Phrealcia eximiella is a species of moth of the  family Ypsolophidae. It is found in Spain, France, Italy, Austria and Switzerland.

The wingspan is 16.5–17.5 mm.

References

External links
lepiforum.de

Ypsolophidae
Moths of Europe